Ken Moynagh  a British medical missionary to Rwanda.

References
Patricia St. John, Man of Two Worlds: The Life of Ken Moynagh, Worthing, Sussex: Henry E Walter Ltd (1976)

Year of birth missing
Place of birth missing
British Christian missionaries
Christian medical missionaries
Christian missionaries in Rwanda
British expatriates in Rwanda